Hicks Creek, also known as Reynolds Creek, is a perennial  northeast flowing stream in Santa Clara County, California, United States. It is tributary to Guadalupe Creek, which is in turn, tributary to the Guadalupe River and south San Francisco Bay at San Jose, California.

History
Hicks Creek is named for Thomas Pascoe Brown Hicks, a native of Cornwall, England born in 1825, who immigrated to California in 1854. He was naturalized in Tuolumne County in 1862 and settled in Santa Clara County later that year. Hicks owned various lands about the Guadalupe Mine and operated a store there until his death in 1901. He paid for the survey of Hicks Road, which until 1956 ran from Camden Avenue to Alamitos Road.

Hicks Road runs along Guadalupe Creek, and Hicks Creek is the first significant tributary of Guadalupe Creek below Guadalupe Reservoir and Dam. This portion of the upper Guadalupe River watershed below the Dam was near the Guadalupe Mine, part of the New Almaden Mercury Mining District, established in 1845 in the hills south of San Jose, California, which hosted the first and most productive mercury mines in the state. Hicks Flat, at the confluence of Hicks Creek with Guadalupe Creek, is the location of a recent mercury mine-waste clean-up.

Watershed 
The southern Santa Cruz Mountains were originally named by the Spanish as the Sierra Azul or "Blue Mountains", which is the namesake for the Sierra Azul Open Space District. Hicks Creek's confluence with Guadalupe Creek is just west of the intersection of Reynolds Road with Hicks Road.

Cherry Springs Creek is a short, perennial tributary of Hicks Creek with its origin in man-made Cherry Springs Pond. It flows northeast  through a natural channel to its mouth at Hicks Creek.

Hicks Creek is defined on the Santa Clara Valley Water District Santa Clara County Creeks Map and the Oakland Museum of California Creek & Watershed Map of South San Jose. Cherry Springs Creek and Hicks Creek are reversed on a 2005 Guadalupe River Watershed mercury total maximum daily load (TMDL) report and a 2011 geologic map of a mercury mine waste inventory report.

Ecology
According to numerous reports, Hicks Creek's lower reaches host spawning steelhead trout (Oncorhynchus mykiss) "in almost every pool and riffle". A 2014–2015 steelhead trout survey found "Guadalupe Creek above Hicks Road had the longest contiguous area of flowing freshwater" with appropriate conditions for residence of O. mykiss in the Guadalupe River watershed.

The entire Hicks Creek watershed is protected on the Sierra Azul Open Space Preserve lands.

See also 
 Guadalupe Creek
 Guadalupe River
 Oakland Museum of California

References

External links 
 Guadalupe-Coyote Resource Conservation District
 Sierra Azul Open Space Preserve, Midpeninsula Regional Open Space District

See also
 List of watercourses in the San Francisco Bay Area

Rivers of Santa Clara County, California
Santa Cruz Mountains
Rivers of Northern California